Reports of cases in the Court of King's Bench, in the 11 and 12 years of Geo. II. is the title of a collection of nominate reports, by George Andrews, of cases decided in the Court of King's Bench between approximately 1738 and 1739. For the purpose of citation their name may be abbreviated to "Andr". They are reprinted in volume 95 of the English Reports.

J. G. Marvin said:

References
Andrews, G. Reports of cases in the Court of King's Bench, in the 11 and 12 years of Geo. II. 2d edit. With notes and an appendix, containing additional cases. By G. W. Vernon. 8vo. Dublin. 1791. Digitised copy.

Sets of reports reprinted in the English Reports
Court of King's Bench (England)